Archambault Boats was a French boat builder based in Dangé-Saint-Romain. The company specialized in the design and manufacture of monohull fibreglass sailboats.

History
Archambault Shipyard was founded in 1959 by Emmanuel Archambault. The company ran into financial problems in 2011. In November 2012, Gilles Caminade purchased the business retaining Emmanuel Archambault as general manager. In 2015, Archambault was intended to be purchased by BG Race, a company founded in 2013 by Louis Burton and Servane Escoffier, who wanted to move production to Saint-Malo, planning to call it Archambault by BG Race, but the transaction was not completed. At the end of 2017 the partners sold Archambault to the pilot and amateur yachtsman Jean-Charles Thomas, who had planned to restart production, but by 2023 there was no indication this had been achieved and operations seem to have come to an end in 2014.

The first designs produced were the Brick and the Atlante in the late 1960s.

The company used the design services of Joubert Nivelt Design for many of its racers, including the 2012 Archambault A27.

The 2004 Archambault A40 was the largest boat produced by the company, with a length overall of 

The Archambault A31, a scaled-down follow-on to the successful Archambault A35 and Archambault A40RC racers, was introduced in 2009. In a 2009 review of the A31 naval architect Robert H. Perry wrote, "the Archambault boats are quickly making a name for themselves as quality-built race winners in Europe."

The company's M34 was selected as the one-design class boat for the Tour de France à la voile in 2011 and served in that role until 2014.

During its lifetime the company was a mid-sized boat builder, neither building "one-off" custom boats nor large production runs. In 2012 it was reported that they were building 160 boats per year, with 60% being exported from France.

In a 2014 review of the A13 written for Sails Magazine, Kevin Green noted, "the relatively small number of Archambaults in Australia have had some big wins over the years which says a lot for this small boutique French yard that excels at building competitive cruiser-racers, with the emphasis heavily on the performance side of that equation."

One of the last boats built was the Archambault A13, a  racer. Intended for mass production by BG Race, only one boat was completed before the company went out of business early in 2015.

Boats 
Summary of boats built by Archambault Boats:

Herbulaot Brick - 1967
Mallard Atlante - 1967
Archambault Bagheera - 1968
Archambault Surprise 25 - 1977
Archambault Suspens - 1979
Archambault Coco - 1985
Sprint 95 - 1989
Archambault Grand Surprise - 1999
Sprinto - 2000
Archambault A40 - 2004
Archambault A40RC - 2005
Archambault A35 - 2006
Archambault A31 - 2009
Archambault M34 - 2010
Archambault A27 - 2012
Archambault A35R - 2014
Archambault A35RC
Archambault A13 - 2014

See also
List of sailboat designers and manufacturers

References

External links

Official website archives on Archive.org

Archambault Boats